The 2002 Speedway World Cup Event 1 was the first race of the 2002 Speedway World Cup season. It took place on August 4, 2002 in the Sheffield Sports Stadium in Sheffield, Great Britain.

Results

Heat details

References

See also 
 2002 Speedway World Cup
 motorcycle speedway

E1
Speedway
2000s in Sheffield